Vadgam is one of the 182 Legislative Assembly constituencies of Gujarat state in India. It is part of Banaskantha district, numbered as 11-Vadgam and is reserved for candidates belonging to the Scheduled Castes. It falls under the Patan Lok Sabha constituency.

List of segments
This assembly seat represents the following segments,

 Vadgam Taluka
 Palanpur Taluka (Part) Villages – Hathidra, Kumpar, Godh, Dhandha, Khasa, Hoda, Galwada, Sagrosana, Bhagal (Jagana),Manaka, Gola, Merwada (Ratanpur), Vagda, Jagana, Vasna (Jagana), Badarpura (Kalusana), Saripada, Patosan, Salla, Sasam, Takarwada, Tokariya, Sedrasana, Kamalpur, Fatepur, Semodra, Asmapura (Gola), Dhelana, Kharodiya, Jasleni, Badargadh, Kanodar (CT).

Members of Legislative Assembly

Election results

2022 
 

<

2017

2012

2007

See also
 List of constituencies of the Gujarat Legislative Assembly
 Banaskantha district

References

External links
 

Assembly constituencies of Gujarat
Politics of Banaskantha district